Michael Capel, 43, a man with schizophrenia, died on 10 October 2008, from multiple gunshot wounds during a confrontation with police at Belmont, near Newcastle, New South Wales. The shooting followed reports that Capel had assaulted his mother and a local worker. Apparently Capel had come off his medication and become violent. A coronial inquest into Capel's death heard that he had "opened the door to police while holding a large knife and began walking towards officers". Following the death, a coroner has recommended special training for frontline police dealing with the mentally ill.

In New South Wales, other police shooting fatalities related to mentally-ill people have included Adam Salter (shot dead in Sydney in 2009), Elijah Holcombe (shot dead in Armidale in 2009), and Roni Levi (shot dead on Bondi Beach in 1997). In Victoria, the fatalities included the 2008 shooting death of Tyler Cassidy.

See also
 Adam Salter
 Death of Beto Laudisio
 Death of Tyler Cassidy
 Rodney Ansell

References

People shot dead by law enforcement officers in Australia
People with schizophrenia
Mental health law in Australia
Deaths by firearm in New South Wales
2008 deaths
1960s births